Events from the year 1926 in Michigan.

Office holders

State office holders
 Governor of Michigan: Alex J. Groesbeck (Republican)
 Lieutenant Governor of Michigan: George W. Welsh (Republican)
 Michigan Attorney General: Clare Retan (Republican)
 Michigan Secretary of State: Charles J. DeLand (Republican)
 Speaker of the Michigan House of Representatives: Fred B. Wells (Republican)
 Chief Justice, Michigan Supreme Court: John E. Bird

Mayors of major cities
 Mayor of Detroit: John W. Smith
 Mayor of Grand Rapids: Elvin Swarthout
 Mayor of Flint: Judson L. Transue
 Mayor of Lansing: Alfred H. Doughty
 Mayor of Saginaw:

Federal office holders

 U.S. Senator from Michigan: James J. Couzens (Republican)
 U.S. Senator from Michigan: Woodbridge N. Ferris (Democrat)
 House District 1: John B. Sosnowski (Republican)
 House District 2: Earl C. Michener (Republican)
 House District 3: Joseph L. Hooper (Republican)
 House District 4: John C. Ketcham (Republican)
 House District 5: Carl E. Mapes (Republican)
 House District 6: Grant M. Hudson (Republican)
 House District 7: Louis C. Cramton (Republican)
 House District 8: Bird J. Vincent (Republican)
 House District 9: James C. McLaughlin (Republican)
 House District 10: Roy O. Woodruff (Republican)
 House District 11: Frank D. Scott (Republican)
 House District 12: W. Frank James (Republican)
 House District 13: Clarence J. McLeod (Republican)

Population

Sports

Baseball
 1926 Detroit Tigers season – Under manager Ty Cobb, the Tigers compiled a 79–75 record and finished in sixth place in the American League. The team's statistical leaders included Heinie Manush with a .378 batting average and 14 home runs, Harry Heilmann with 101 RBIs, Earl Whitehill with 16 wins, and Rip Collins with a 2.73 earned run average.

American football
 1926 Detroit Panthers season – Under head coach Jimmy Conzelman, the Panthers compiled a 4–6–2 record and finished 12th in the National Football League. Gus Sonnenberg led the team with 34 points scored on nine field goals and seven extra points.
 1926 Michigan Wolverines football team – In their 25th season under head coach Fielding H. Yost, the Wolverines compiled a 7–1 record and tied for the Big Ten Conference championship. Quarterback Benny Friedman and end Bennie Oosterbaan were All-Americans.
 1926 Western State Hilltoppers football team – Under head coach Earl Martineau, the Hilltoppers compiled a 7–1 record and outscored opponents by a total of 132 to 20.
 1926 Michigan State Normal Normalites football team – Under head coach Elton Rynearson, the Normalites compiled a 6–1 record, shut out six of their seven opponents, and outscored all opponents by a total of 113 to 12.
 1926 Detroit Titans football team – Under head coach Gus Dorais, the Titans compiled a 3–6–1 record and outscored all opponents by a combined 132 to 62.
 1926 Michigan State Spartans football team – Under head coach Ralph H. Young, the Spartans compiled a 3–4–1 record.
 1926 Central Michigan Dragons football team – Under head coach Wallace Parker, the Dragons compiled a 3–4–1 record and were outscored by a combined total of 90 to 66.

Basketball
 1925–26 Michigan Wolverines men's basketball team – Under head coach E. J. Mather, the Wolverines compiled a 12–5 record and tied for the Big Ten Conference championship.

Chronology of events

January
 January 1 - The National Automobile Chamber of Commerce announced that vehicle production in 1925 reached an all-time high with 3,883,000 cars and 492,000 trucks. The number of Ford Motor Co. employees in the United States had risen to 191,948.
 January 6 - Police supervised the seizure of property at the Detroit headquarters of the Ku Klux Klan at East Hancock Avenue and John R.  Street following a judgment for nonpayment of rent. Members of the organization threatened violence against reporters covering the event.
 January 9 - Police conducted 69 raids resulting in arrests of 29 women and 26 men and seizure of 600 gallons of beer.  The raids targeted "prohibition violators, disorderly houses and gambling resorts."
 John W. Smith was inaugurated for his second term as Mayor of Detroit. In an address to the city's Common Council, he urged respect for the laws of the city, state and country as a vital factor in American life.

February

March

April

May

June

July

August

September

October

November
 November 2 - A number of elections occurred, including:
 United States House of Representatives - All 13 of Michigan's U.S. Representatives won re-election except for John B. Sosnowski in Michigan's 1st congressional district, who was not renominated and was replaced by fellow Republican, Robert H. Clancy, and Frank D. Scott in Michigan's 11th congressional district, who was also not renominated and was replaced by fellow Republican, Frank P. Bohn. The delegation remained entirely Republican.
 Michigan Governor - Republican nominee, Fred W. Green, defeated Democratic nominee William Comstock.

December

Births
 January 29 - Bob Hollway, assistant coach in NFL (1967–1986), in Ann Arbor, Michigan
 March 4 - Richard DeVos, co-founder of Amway, in Grand Rapids, Michigan
 March 24 - William Porter, gold medalist in 110 m hurdles at 1948 Olympics, in Essex Township, Michigan
 March 29 - Joseph Ponsetto, quarterback for Michigan (1944-1945), in Kent County, Michigan
 April 30 - Ed Bagdon, lineman for Michigan State who won the 1948 Outland Trophy and then played in NFL (1950-1953), in Dearborn, Michigan
 July 8 - John Dingell, U.S. House of Representatives (1955-2015), in Colorado Springs, Colorado
 August 21 - Dick Rifenburg, All-American football end at Michigan and in NFL, in Petoskey, Michigan
 September 19 - James Lipton, writer, lyricist, actor and dean emeritus of the Actors Studio Drama School and host of Inside the Actors Studio, in Detroit
 September 29 - Philip Ruppe, U.S. House of Representatives (1967-1979), in Laurium, Michigan
 October 19 - Joel Feinberg, political and legal philosopher, in Detroit
 November 4 - Tubby Raymond, head football coach at Delaware (1966-2001) inducted into College Football Hall of Fame, in Flint, Michigan

Deaths
 March 28 - John Treadway Rich, Governor of Michigan (1893-1897), at age 84 in St. Petersburg, Florida
 October 31 - Harry Houdini, stage musician and stunt performer, at age 52 in Detroit

See also
 History of Michigan
 History of Detroit

References